

Current
 Troy Aikman: Host, The Troy Aikman Show (?-present)
 Bob Berger: Host, Sports Saturday and Sports Sunday (?-present)
 Tim Brando: Host, The Tim Brando Show (?-present)
 Leslie Rolfe: Host, The Coach Les Show (2016-present)
 Dave Denicke: Host, SNR Sports Nightly (2008–present)
 Jason Goch: Update Anchor, (?-present)
 Jon Jeffries: Update Anchor, (?-present)
 Randall Mell: Contributor, Nationwide Golf Exchange (?-present)
 Tim Montemayor: Host, The Tim Montemayor Show (?-present)
 Tim Rosaforte: Contributor, Nationwide Golf Exchange (?-present)
 Brad Sham: Contributor, The Troy Aikman Show (?-present)
 Bob Shelton: Host, Sports Saturday and Sports Sunday (?-present)
 Arnie Spanier: Host, The Arnie Spanier Show (?-present)
 Matt Spiegel: Host, SNR Pregame and Fantasy Source (?-present)
 David Stein: Host, The David Stein Show (2005–present)
 Turk Stevens: Update Anchor (?-present)
 Doug Stewart: Host, 2 Live Stews (2008–present)
 Ryan Stewart: Host, 2 Live Stews (2008–present)
 Mark Wood: Host, Nationwide Golf Exchange (?-present)
 Todd Wright: Host, Todd Wright Tonight (2006–present)

Former
 Nestor Aparicio: Host, Nasty Nationwide (2000-2002)
 Rick Ballou: Host, The Rick Ballou Show (2000-2006)
 Tony Bruno: Host, The Tony Bruno Show (?-2008)
 James Brown: Host, The James Brown Show (?-2006, remains on as "special contributor")
 Papa Joe Chevalier: Host, "The Papa Joe Show" (-2005), went into independent syndication from KENO for a time.  Died in 2011.
 Chet Coppock, host of the weekend Coppock on Sports (2000-2006)
 Elizabeth Hess: Host, Murray in the Morning (2004-2005)
 Bruce Jacobs: Host, "The Men's Room" with himself and Scott Wetzel: (1999-2001)
 Bob Kemp: Host, The Bob Kemp Show
 Bill Lekas: Host, The Morning Show (?-2007) 
 Dan Manucci: Host, Calling All Sports with Roc & Manuch (2008-2008)
 Jay Mariotti: Host, Jay Marriotti Show with Jim Litke (?-2002)
 Andy Masur: Update Anchor, (?-1999)
 Mike Muraco: Host, Calling All Sports with Roc & Manuch (2008-2008)
 Bruce Murray: Host, Murray in the Morning (2002-2005)
 Chris Russell: Host, Russell Mania (?-2007)
 Doug Russell (sportscaster): Host, Reporter, and SportsFlash Anchor (2000-2007, 2011)
 Dave Smith: Host, The Dave Smith Show (2006-2008)
 Mark Vasko: Update Anchor, Reporter, Fill-In Talk Host (1998-1999)(2006-2008)
 Scott Wetzel: Host/Update anchor (?-2005?), has done occasional substitute work for the network since his departure 
 Mark Willard: Co-Host, The Tony Bruno Show (?-2008)

American radio sports announcers